Euchrysops philbyi is a butterfly in the family Lycaenidae. It is found in south-western Saudi Arabia and Yemen.

References

Butterflies described in 1954
Euchrysops